Louis-Anselme Longa (4 April 1809 – 13 December 1869) was a French genre artist in the Academic style. He also created numerous church paintings, but is best known for his Orientalist works.

Biography
He studied design in Paris with Paul Delaroche, and had his first exhibit at the Salon in 1835. Originally, he appears to have been attracted to the troubador style.

In 1841, he was hired by the "Commission d'exploration scientifique d'Algérie" and employed as a painter and draftsman's assistant to accompany an expedition. He went to Algiers first, but did most of his work in the region surrounding Constantine, which had recently been occupied by French troops. Eventually, 138 portraits and scenes were completed and delivered to Jean-de-Dieu Soult, Chairman of the Commission. They are currently in the possession of the Muséum National d'Histoire Naturelle. In regard to his portraits, Longa was accused by his superior, Colonel Bory de Saint-Vincent, of departing from their original scientific and didactic intent, but Longa's approach was defended by Soult.

From 1843 to 1847, some of the more notable paintings were presented at the Salon. His experiences and drawings were also turned into a "report", published by the new journal L'Illustration, with text by Alphonse Castaing (1822-1888).

He returned permanently to Mont-de-Marsan in 1848 and opened a studio. Much of his time was spent creating promotions and decorations for local events or visiting celebrities. In 1866, he was named a Professor of design at the newly opened "Lycée Impérial de Mont-de-Marsan" (later  renamed in honor of Victor Duruy) and remained there until his death.

In addition to his work in Algeria, he painted numerous portraits and created decorations in several churches; most notably those in his hometown, Geloux, Tartas, Maillères and Uchacq-et-Parentis. Very often, however, attribution of specific details is difficult and some works may have been done in conjunction with his brother Louis-François, a goldsmith and amateur painter.

Selected paintings

See also
 List of Orientalist artists
 Orientalism

References

Further reading
 Simone Abbate, Une Vie de Peintre: Louis-Anselme Longa, (Volume 19 of "Bulletin, Amis des Archives des Landes et Association Landaise de Recherches et de Sauvegarde") 2008

External links

1809 births
1869 deaths
Portrait painters
Orientalist painters
People from Mont-de-Marsan
19th-century French painters